Lawrence Fraser Abbott (1859–1933) was an American editor and writer, son of Lyman Abbott.

Biography
He was born in Brooklyn, New York, to Lyman Abbott. He graduated from Amherst College in 1881. In 1891, he became president of the Outlook Company. As well as being a close friend to Theodore Roosevelt, throughout almost his whole life, he was also secretary to Roosevelt during the latter's tour of Europe and Africa (1909–10), and edited Roosevelt's African and European Addresses (1910). He was the author of an article on Theodore Roosevelt in the Encyclopædia Britannica (1911), and of Impressions of Theodore Roosevelt (1919) and The Story of NYLIC (1930).

See also
Clara Whitehill Hunt
Michael Ableman
Adeline Pond Adams

External links

 Amherst College alumni entry
 Books from 1930 with US copyright not renewed (source for 1930 book and death date)
 
 

1859 births
1933 deaths
American male biographers
Amherst College alumni
Writers from Brooklyn
Theodore Roosevelt administration personnel
Abbott family
20th-century American historians
American male non-fiction writers
20th-century American biographers
Historians from New York (state)
20th-century American male writers